Willy Taveras (born December 25, 1981) is a Dominican former professional baseball player. A center fielder, Taveras has played in Major League Baseball (MLB) for the Houston Astros, Colorado Rockies, Cincinnati Reds, and Washington Nationals.

Professional career

Houston Astros

Taveras played in 10 games at the end of the  Astros season, mostly as a pinch runner.

In , he led the majors in infield hits (71), bunt hits (31), and singles (152), and was tops among rookies in runs (82), hits (172), and stolen bases (34; 6th in the NL). He hit .291. Taveras was the Astros' starting center fielder during his rookie season (2005), replacing Carlos Beltrán, who signed with the New York Mets in the offseason. In Game 4 of the 2005 NLCS against the St. Louis Cardinals, he made a catch while running up Tal's Hill in Minute Maid Park's deep center field to end the 8th inning and preserve a 2-1 lead. He scored the winning run as a pinch-runner the inning before on a short sacrifice fly to center field.

After the season, Taveras was voted National League Rookie of the Year by the players (Ryan Howard of the Philadelphia Phillies won the actual Rookie of the Year Award).

In , Taveras' batting average regressed to .278, though he again led the majors in bunt hits (21) and had 33 stolen bases (10th in the NL), but just 30 RBI. Taveras had a 30-game hitting streak that ended August 29, 2006, during a game in which he was hit twice by Milwaukee Brewers pitcher Tomo Ohka. His streak is a franchise record, breaking the record of 25 previously held by Jeff Kent.  He is the 42nd player in MLB history with a hit streak of 30-or-more games. Within that streak, Taveras had a streak of singles in 28 consecutive games, tying a National League record set by Willie Davis in 1969. , Taveras and Davis still hold the league record.

Colorado Rockies
On December 12, 2006, Taveras was traded along with Taylor Buchholz and Jason Hirsh by the Astros to the Colorado Rockies for Rockies pitchers Jason Jennings and Miguel Asencio.

In 2007, Taveras hit .320, including an MLB leading 27 bunt singles, 2 home runs, 24 RBIs, 33 stolen bases, and caught stealing 9 times. He was part of the World Series roster after making a big play in the NLCS vs the Arizona Diamondbacks. The Rockies were swept by the Red Sox.

In a 22-inning game played between April 17–18, at Petco Park, Taveras set a Rockies' club record with 10 at-bats in the game.

He led MLB with 68 stolen bases during the 2008 season, and led the NL with 24 bunt hits. At the same time, his .296 slugging percentage was the lowest in the majors. Defensively, however, his .976 fielding percentage was the lowest of all qualifying major league center fielders.

On December 12, 2008, the Rockies non-tendered Taveras, making him a free agent.

Cincinnati Reds
On December 27, 2008, Taveras signed a two-year deal worth $6.25 million with the Cincinnati Reds.
In his debut with the Reds, he hit a pinch-hit triple in the 8th inning after being down with the flu for over a week.

In 2009, Taveras had the lowest slugging percentage, .285, and the lowest on-base percentage, .275, of all National League players with at least 350 plate appearances. On February 1, 2010, Taveras was traded along with Adam Rosales to the Oakland Athletics for Aaron Miles and a player to be named later. He was later designated for assignment by Oakland. Taveras declined a Triple-A assignment and was granted free agency.

Washington Nationals
On February 15, 2010, Taveras signed a minor league contract with the Washington Nationals with an invite to spring training. He played 27 games, and on May 21, 2010 he was granted his unconditional release.

Philadelphia Phillies
On June 3, 2010, he signed a minor league contract with the Philadelphia Phillies. He was assigned to Triple-A Lehigh Valley.

On June 29, 2010, he was released after playing 23 games for the IronPigs, batting .208 in 96 AB's, with nine stolen bases.

On August 15, 2010, Taveras signed a minor league deal with the Texas Rangers.

Return to the Rockies

On January 25, 2011, Taveras signed a minor league contract with the Colorado Rockies. He spent the 2011 season with the Rockies Triple-A affiliate Colorado Springs Sky Sox, batting .308 in 97 games with a .336 on-base percentage. Due to problems with the sports agency that formerly represented him Taveras was out of American baseball for the entire 2012 season.

Kansas City Royals
On December 11, 2012, Taveras was signed to a minor league contract by the Kansas City Royals with an invitation to spring training. At the time of the signing Taveras was playing baseball in the Mexican Pacific League with the Yaquis de Obregón.

Sugar Land Skeeters
Taveras signed with the Sugar Land Skeeters of the Atlantic League of Professional Baseball for the 2015 season. This was Taveras first year in Independent Baseball.

Pericos de Puebla
On April 11, 2016, Taveras signed with the Pericos de Puebla of the Mexican Baseball League.

Acereros de Monclova
On February 21, 2017, Taveras, along with Chad Gaudin, Daric Barton, Nyjer Morgan, Manny Rodriguez, and Rodolfo Amador, were traded to the Acereros de Monclova in exchange for RHP Joaquín Lara. He became a free agent following the 2017 season.

Return to Sugar Land
On May 13, 2019, after spending all of 2018 out of professional baseball, Taveras signed with the Sugar Land Skeeters of the Atlantic League of Professional Baseball. He was released on July 22, 2019.

Scouting report
Taveras has good skills for slap-hitting; however, he strikes out frequently (103 times in 2005) and rarely walks. His career-high in walks is 36, resulting in a low on-base percentage. In addition, Taveras is an exceptionally poor power hitter, producing the lowest slugging percentage among all regular major league outfielders for both the 2005 and 2006 seasons. He has great speed and has been clocked at 3.57 seconds from home to first as a right-handed hitter. Taveras has also led the league in infield singles, and his BABIP (batting average on balls in play) was .374 in 2007.

Career highlights
 Player's Choice Rookie of the Year.
2005 Sporting News Rookie of the Year
Named to 2006 Dominican Republic World Baseball Classic team.
30 game hitting streak (Astros franchise record).

See also

 Houston Astros award winners and league leaders
 List of Colorado Rockies team records
 List of Major League Baseball annual stolen base leaders
 List of Major League Baseball career stolen bases leaders
 List of Major League Baseball players from the Dominican Republic

References

External links

1981 births
Living people
Acereros de Monclova players
Águilas Cibaeñas players
Burlington Indians players (1986–2006)
Cincinnati Reds players
Colorado Rockies players
Columbus RedStixx players
Colorado Springs Sky Sox players
Dominican Republic expatriate baseball players in Mexico
Dominican Republic expatriate baseball players in the United States
Gwinnett Braves players
Houston Astros players
Kinston Indians players

Lehigh Valley IronPigs players
Major League Baseball center fielders
Major League Baseball players from the Dominican Republic
Mexican League baseball center fielders
Mexican League baseball right fielders
National League stolen base champions
Oklahoma City RedHawks players
Omaha Storm Chasers players
People from Hermanas Mirabal Province
Pericos de Puebla players
Round Rock Express players
Scottsdale Scorpions players
Sugar Land Skeeters players
Washington Nationals players
Yaquis de Obregón players
World Baseball Classic players of the Dominican Republic
2006 World Baseball Classic players
2009 World Baseball Classic players